The 8th Asian Junior Table Tennis Championships 2001 were held in Hong Kong, Hong Kong, from  24 to 29 December 2001. It was organised by the Hong Kong Table Tennis Association Limited under the authority of the Asian Table Tennis Union (ATTU) and International Table Tennis Federation (ITTF).

Medal summary

Events

Medal table

See also

2001 World Junior Table Tennis Championships
Asian Table Tennis Championships
Asian Table Tennis Union

References

Asian Junior and Cadet Table Tennis Championships
Asian Junior and Cadet Table Tennis Championships
Asian Junior and Cadet Table Tennis Championships
Asian Junior and Cadet Table Tennis Championships
Table tennis competitions in Hong Kong
International sports competitions hosted by Hong Kong
Asian Junior and Cadet Table Tennis Championships